The Assembleias de Deus are a group of Pentecostal denominations in Brazil founded by Daniel Berg and Gunnar Vingren, who came to Brazil as missionaries from the Swedish Pentecostal movement. The Assembleias de Deus are related to the worldwide Pentecostal movement, and some groups are affiliated with the Assemblies of God. Currently, the organization is one of the largest Protestant denominations worldwide.

History 

 
The  began when Daniel Berg and Gunnar Vingren, two Swedish Pentecostal missionaries departed to Brazil.

The Pentecostal movement in Brazil had already begun by that time among Italians in São Paulo, by an Italian-American missionary, Louis Francescon, who founded the Christian Congregation of Brazil (CCB) in 1910. While the CCB spread in the South, the  reached the Amazon villages and the semi-arid Nordeste before migrants from the North brought the Church to Rio de Janeiro and São Paulo in the late 1920s.

The Swedish Pentecostals gave autonomy to the Brazilian  in a General Convention in 1932. From that time onward, the American Assemblies of God increased their presence in the Brazilian denomination, mainly in doctrinal and teaching spheres, but the church retained its independence from its American brethren. Walter Hollenweger explains the relationship as follows: "In the mission statistics of the North American Assemblies of God, the  figure as their mission church. In contrast, the Brazilian Pentecostals regard themselves as an independent church."

Denominations 
Since the 1911 the  have suffered several schisms and splits. As a consequence, many Conventions and  left using the same name, though they are totally independent organizations. The most significant denominations named  are:
Convenção Geral das Assembleias de Deus no Brasil (CGADB)—(English: General Convention of the Assemblies of God in Brazil) the only authentic and historical convention of the pioneer church in Brazil, headquartered in Belém do Pará; it considers itself the heir of the Swedish mission. The CGADB has nearly twenty thousand ministries. Since 2018, the federal government has recognized the authenticity of the church, the Convention and its legacy in Brazilian history. Some federal members of parliament are members of the Assemblies of God and interact institutionally with public authorities on matters of interest to the denomination.
 (CONAMAD in Portuguese)—founded by pastor Paulo Leivas Macalão. This ministry was founded on November 15, 1958. Madureira was part of CGADB until an extraordinary assembly where the ministers of Madureira withdraw from the convention. By this time Madureira had more ministers under a single leadership. Since the other brothers tried to move Madureira away from a protagonist role in the leadership of the convention, the ministers left to create another convention.

Foreign work
The  has always sent missionaries abroad, starting in 1913 when a returning Portuguese immigrant was sent to Portugal. Today, there are Brazilian missionaries in Latin America and Portuguese-speaking Africa. There also are  among Brazilian immigrant communities in North America, Japan, and Western Europe, but they do not typically have a relationship with local World Assemblies of God Fellowship-affiliated national denominations.

In the United States there exists , mostly on the east coast; some are affiliated with the Brazilian District of the Assemblies of God, but the majority of the Brazilian churches are either independent or linked to their  back in Brazil.

Organization
The  have a non-territorial episcopal polity (called ) where each  is a directed by a mother church under a pastor-president (also called bishop or apostle in various ) with affiliated congregations and preaching points. The mother church receives tithes and manages the funds of the affiliated local churches, as well as assigning pastors to local congregations. Pastoral leadership has a strong influence on the decision-making process, and the members only rubber stamp the 's decisions.

As the  structure overlaps many territorial boundaries, there usually is not much organizational collaboration among . Each  operates almost entirely independently, and ends up becoming an independent denomination unto itself. Among the major  are the Assembly of God Bethlehem Ministry, which has about 2,200 churches concentrated in the south-central and headquartered in the Belenzinho neighborhood of São Paulo. In 2008,  was chaired by Pastor José Wellington Bezerra da Costa, who succeeded Pastor Cicero Canuto de Lima, who also chaired the CGADB.

Since the 1980s, for administrative reasons, notably after the death of Pastor Paul Leiva Macalão and his wife, Zelia, a missionary, the  has undergone several divisions that gave rise to various conventions and ministries with autonomous administration in various regions of the country. The most significant of the independent ministries are the Ministry of Madureira, whose church has existed since the 1930s, founded by the aforementioned Pastor Paul Leiva Macalão and, in 1958, served as the basis for structuring the national ministry chaired by him until his death in late 1982.

Doctrine

Politics
In Brazil, the  have an increasing influence on politics, although representing only a minor segment of the population. The PSC is led by Pastor Everaldo Pereira.

Marina Silva pursues ecological ideas and supports the rights of the indigenous tribes of her country. Silva has been at times criticized by church leadership for her leftist stance on many issues, such as drug reform.

See also
List of the largest Protestant bodies
 Assembly of God USA
 Assembly of God Bethlehem Ministry
 List of Assemblies of God people

References

Bibliography
 Almeida, Abraão de. História das Assembléias de Deus no Brasil.  Rio de Janeiro: CPAD, 1982.
 Berg, David. Enviado por Deus - Memórias de Daniel Berg Rio de Janeiro: CPAD,
 Conde, Emílio. História das Assembléias de Deus no Brasil. Rio de Janeiro: CPAD, 2000.
 Freston, Paul. "Breve Historia do pentecostalismo brasileiro". Antoniazzi, A. (org.). Nem anjos nem demônios interpretações sociológicas do pentecostalismo. Petrópolis: Vozes, 1994.
 Vingren, Ivar. O Diário do Pioneiro.Rio de Janeiro: CPAD,
 Vingren, Ivar, Nyberg Gunilla, Alvarsson Jan-Åke, Johannesson Jan-Endy. Det började i Pará: svensk pingstmission i Brasilien. Estocolmo: Missionsinstitutet-PMU, 1994.

Further reading

External links

Brazil 
 Assembléia de Deus Ministerio do Bélem no Brasil (CGADB)
 CGADB - Convenção Geral das Assembléias de Deus no Brasil in Portuguese
 ADM - Assembléia de Deus - Missões - em Campo Grande, MS, Brasil in Portuguese

English-speaking countries 

 Assembleia de Deus de Londres: England, Western Europe
 Assembléia de Deus Anglo-Brasileira: England
 Assembleia de Deus - Ministério Madureira: United States
 Assembleia de Deus - Ministério Restauração: United States
 Assembleia de Deus - Ministério do Belém (CGADB) Europe
 Assembleia de Deus do Canadá: Canada
 Assembleia de Deus - Ministério de Toronto: Canada, Brazil, Bolivia

Assemblies of God
Protestantism in Brazil
Christian organizations established in 1911
Pentecostal denominations established in the 20th century
Pentecostal denominations in South America
Pentecostal churches in Brazil